Areias may refer to:

Places

Brazil
 Areias, São Paulo, a city in the State of São Paulo

Portugal

 Areias (Barcelos), a civil parish in the municipality of Barcelos
 Areias (Ferreira do Zêzere), a civil parish in the municipality of Ferreira do Zêzere
 Areias (Santo Tirso), a civil parish in the municipality of Santo Tirso

People
 Areias (surname)